The 1985 Belgian Grand Prix was a Formula One motor race held at Spa-Francorchamps on 15 September 1985. It was the thirteenth round of the 1985 FIA Formula One World Championship. The race was the 43rd Belgian Grand Prix, the 31st to be held at Spa and the second since the circuit had been rebuilt and re-opened at half its original length in 1979. The race was held over 43 laps of the seven kilometre circuit for a total race distance of 301 kilometres.

The race was won by Brazilian driver Ayrton Senna driving a Lotus 97T. It was Senna's second World Championship victory and the first of five he would win at Spa-Francorchamps. Senna won by 28 seconds over British driver Nigel Mansell driving a Williams FW10. Third was World Championship points leader, French driver Alain Prost driving a McLaren MP4/2B. The win promoted Senna to third in the drivers' standings and third place allowed Prost to expand his lead over Ferrari driver Michele Alboreto to 16 points.

Originally scheduled to take place on 2 June 1985, the Grand Prix was rescheduled for September after the recently resurfaced track became damaged during the race weekend.

Race summary

Track surface and postponement 
This was the second Belgian Grand Prix to occur at a reconfigured Circuit de Spa-Francorchamps, with the first being the 1983 race. Race organisers opted to resurface the track with a material called Stress Absorbing Membrane Interlayer that intended to provide improved grip in wet-weather conditions at a cost of £3 million. Fédération Internationale du Sport Automobile (FISA), the governing body of Formula One, was queried about the resurfacing work and replied it would approve if race organisers complied with a regulation that mandates any such work occur 60 days beforehand. Local bureaucracy and a harsh winter caused delays to the work, which were reportedly finished ten days before the event's scheduled date of 31 May, and forced a cancellation of a pre-race test session at the circuit. Organisers did not refer the incident to the Fédération Internationale de l'Automobile and went ahead.

Warm weather, the powerful turbocharged cars of the time, and their wide, slick tyres, damaged the track during the Friday practice session. Repairs to the circuit were conducted overnight and undamaged turns were also addressed. After around 25 minutes into the Saturday practice session, all on-track activity stopped, since drivers noticed the damage and held a series of meetings. One suggestion was to cancel the remainder of the day's activities, the Sunday morning warm-up session and enter straight into the race on Sunday afternoon. Bernie Ecclestone, the commercial rights holder of Formula One, called every team principal to a meeting and told them to hold the International Formula 3000 support round on Sunday afternoon or it be the primary event. Drivers and officials inspected the track at 18:00 local time. Discussions continued until 19:30 local time and drivers' representative Niki Lauda told the media that the Formula One race would be postponed.

Jean-Marie Balestre, the president of FISA, was furious and summoned race organisers to the FISA executive meeting in Paris "to explain the serious fault committed," and said that they "will be liable to very heavy sanctions." The Belgian ASN was fined $10,000 and a provisional $100,000 bond to be deposited to FISA by the organisers would be returned in the event there were no further problems with the track on the rescheduled date. Ecclestone rescheduled the race to 15 September, following the Italian Grand Prix at the Autodromo Nazionale di Monza and the European Grand Prix at Brands Hatch. The race at Brands Hatch was later moved back by one week to provide the teams with some preparation.

Postponed race 
Because this was a re-scheduled race Formula One's newest team Haas Lola and their driver,  World Champion Alan Jones, who had their first race at the previous round in Italy were not permitted to enter as they were not on the original entry list. During the buildup to the race FISA president Jean-Marie Balestre announced that the controversial South African Grand Prix would take place despite pressure to cancel the event as part of anti-apartheid embargoes.

Missing from the grid was an injured Niki Lauda. At the end of Friday's practice session before qualifying proper, his McLaren MP4/2B's throttle struck open while he was only touring back to the pits. The car slid off the track on the newer section of track and the three time and defending World Champion hit a guardrail and on impact the steering wheel whipped around wrenching his wrist as it did so. X-rays revealed no break but Lauda was not fit to race so he returned home to Austria for further inspection and treatment from his physical therapist Willi Dungl. McLaren initially hoped to put John Watson in Lauda's car but this would have required the approval of all other teams. Mindful of the Constructors' Championship, Ferrari refused to agree, leaving Alain Prost as McLaren's only driver in Belgium. RAM was also down to one car, only bringing a single RAM 03 for Philippe Alliot and the 1985 Formula 3000 champion Christian Danner made his world championship debut with Zakspeed.

Prost took pole position, averaging 135.929 mph (218.756 km/h) from Senna with Nelson Piquet qualifying third in his Brabham BT54, with Alboreto fourth in his Ferrari 156/85. Rain fell before the race leaving the grid to form on a damp track with wet-weather tyres for the first time since Senna won in Portugal. Senna won the start from Piquet but the Brabham spun at the first corner. Senna led from Prost, Mansell and the two Ferraris of Alboreto and Stefan Johansson. The Ferraris were soon out, from a broken clutch and engine respectively. Meanwhile Johansson retired after spinning off at the end of the Kemmel Straight on Lap 8. Prost dropped behind the two Williams FW10s as the field pitted for dry tyres. Late in the race rain fell again and Senna expanded his lead. Keke Rosberg dropped to fourth with a brief pit visit with a brake problem and they finished in that order. Fifth had been Thierry Boutsen until his Arrows A8 broke its gearbox. Piquet claimed fifth from Derek Warwick in a Renault RE60B. Twelve cars finished the race, including for the first time a Minardi as Pierluigi Martini finished twelfth in his Minardi M185. A further two cars, Boutsen and the crashed Ligier JS25 of Jacques Laffite were also classified as finishers. Huub Rothengatter's Osella FA1G fell one lap short of being classified.

Although the marshals led the cars directly into the pits after finish, Ayrton Senna drove around them and took a lap of honour.

Classification

Qualifying

Times recorded on Friday qualifying session before postponement (31 May 1985)

Rescheduled qualifying (13 and 14 September 1985)

Race

Championship standings after the race

Drivers' Championship standings

Constructors' Championship standings

Note: Only the top five positions are included for both sets of standings.

References

Belgian Grand Prix
Grand Prix
Belgian Grand Prix